Pyotr Ivanovich Melissino; c. 1726 – c. 1797) was a General of the Artillery of the Russian Empire and was widely considered the best Russian artilleryman of the 18th century.

Early life
He was born as Petros Melissinos  in 1726, into a Greek family, in the island of Cephalonia, which was then under Venetian rule. His father was a physician who descended from a branch of the noble Eastern 
Roman family of Melissenos that had left Crete in the 15th century and settled on Cephalonia. Throughout his life, he prided himself on his origin. He received a thorough education in his youth and was fluent in many languages, including Russian, German, Italian, French, and Turkish, as well as his native Greek; he also knew some Latin and English.

Career 
Melissinos arrived in Russia during the reign of Peter the Great and ended his career as Vice-President of the Commerce Collegium in 1740-45.

During the Russo-Turkish War, 1768-1774, Pyotr Melissino was in charge of the Russian artillery. His efficient command helped Russian forces prevail against a fourfold numerical superiority of the Ottomans at Khotin, Larga, and Kagula. In 1783, he was appointed Director of the Artillery and Engineering Corps in St. Petersburg. He is remembered as an organizer of the artillery education in the Russian Empire. After the ascension of Emperor Paul, Melissino was put in charge of the entire Russian artillery but died the following year.

Melissino was instrumental in promoting the career of one of Paul's favourites, Aleksey Arakcheyev. His son Aleksey Melissino, a Major General, was killed in the Battle of Dresden (1813). His brother, Ivan Melissino, was Dean of the Moscow University under Catherine the Great.

Jenkins (pp. 35–36) says:

References

Sources
Michael Jenkins, Arakcheev: Grand Vizier of the Russian Empire (Dial Press, 1969)

1726 births
1797 deaths
18th-century Greek people
18th-century military personnel from the Russian Empire
Artillery of Russia
Greek emigrants to Russia
Greek generals
Imperial Russian Army generals
Russian Freemasons
Pyotr
People from Cephalonia
Recipients of the Order of St. George of the Third Degree
Burials at Lazarevskoe Cemetery (Saint Petersburg)